Bilbster was a railway station located in the village of Bilbster, in the Highlands region of Scotland.

The station opened on 28 July 1874. The station buildings were destroyed by fire on 16 September 1877.

It was one of a number of smaller stations on the Far North Line which were closed in 1960.

Sources

References

External links
 RAILSCOT on Sutherland and Caithness Railway
 RAILSCOT page on Bilbster

Disused railway stations in Caithness
Former Highland Railway stations
Railway stations in Great Britain opened in 1874
Railway stations in Great Britain closed in 1960